This is a list of bridges and viaducts in Norway, including those for pedestrians and vehicular traffic.

Historical and architectural interest bridges

Major road and railway bridges 
This table presents the structures with spans greater than 200 meters (non-exhaustive list).

Planned bridges

Alphabetical list 
A
Alversund Bridge
Andøy Bridge
Askøy Bridge
Aursund Bridge

B
Bakkastraumen Bridge
Beisfjord Bridge
Bekkestua Bridge
Bergsøysund Bridge
Boknasund Bridge
Bolsøy Bridge
Brattfoss Bridge
Brattsund Bridge
Breisundet Bridge
Brekke Bridge
Brevik Bridge
Brønnøysund Bridge
By Bridge
Bømla Bridge
Børøy Bridge

D
Djupfjord Bridge
Djupfjordstraumen Bridge
Drammen Bridge
Dromnessund Bridge
Dyrøy Bridge

E
Efjord Bridges
Eiksund Bridge
Einang Sound Bridge
Elgeseter Bridge
Engeløy Bridges
Engøysundet Bridge

F
Flisa Bridge
Folda Bridge
Fosseland Bridge
Frednes Bridge
Fredrikstad Bridge
Fredvang Bridges
Fyksesund Bridge

G
Gamle Bybro, Trondheim (see Old Town Bridge, Trondheim listed below)
Geitøysundet Bridge
Gimsøystraumen Bridge
Giske Bridge
Gisund Bridge
Gjemnessund Bridge
Grenland Bridge
Gutufoss Bridge

H
Hadsel Bridge
Hagelsund Bridge
Hålogaland Bridge
Havøysund Bridge
Helgeland Bridge
Helland Bridge
Henningsvær Bridge
Herøy Bridge
Hestøy Bridge
Hognfjord Bridge — see Kvalsaukan Bridge
Hoholmen Bridge
Hulvågen Bridges

I
Ikjefjord Bridge
Indre Sunnan Bridge

J
Julsrud Bridge

K
Kallestadsundet Bridge - Hordaland
Kalvøyrevet Bridge
Kanalbrua - Tønsberg
Kanstadstraumen Bridge
Karmsund Bridge
Kilstraumen Bridge - Hordaland
Kjellingstraumen Bridge
Kjøllsæter Bridge
Kjerringstraumen Bridge
Knarrlagsundet Bridge
Krabbsundet Bridge
Krossnessund Bridge
Kubholmleia Bridge
Kvalsaukan Bridge
Kvalsund Bridge
Kvaløy Bridge
Kylling Bridge
Kåkern Bridge

L
Langangen Bridge
Langnes Bridge
Lille Lauvøysund Bridge
Loftesnes Bridge
Lokkaren Bridge
Lysefjord Bridge
Løkke Bridge

M
Marøysund Bridge
Mellastraumen Bridge
Midsund Bridge
Minnesund Bridge (new)
Minnesund Bridge (old)
Mjosund Bridge
Mjømnesund Bridge
Mjøsa Bridge
Mjøsund Bridge
Mjåsund Bridge
Måløy Bridge

N
Nappsund Bridge
Nerlandsøy Bridge
New Eidsvoll Bridge
New Fetsund Bridge
Norddalsfjord Bridge
Nordhordland Bridge
Nordsund Bridge, Kristiansund
Nærøysund Bridge

O
Old City Bridge, Trondheim
Old Namsen Bridge
Oldersund Bridge
Omsund Bridge
Osenstraumen Bridge
Osstrupen Bridge
Osterøy Bridge

P
Porsgrunn Bridge
Puddefjord Bridge
Puttesund Bridge

R
Raftsund Bridge
Ramsund Bridge
Randøy Bridge
Reine Bridges
Remøy Bridge
Rombak Bridge
Rongsund Bridge
Rugsund Bridge
Runde Bridge
Røssesund Bridge
Røssøystraumen Bridge
Rånåsfoss Bridge

S
Saltstraumen Bridge
Sami Bridge
Sandhornøy Bridge
Sandnessund Bridge
Sannesund Bridge
Selbjørn Bridge
Skarnsund Bridge
Skattørsundet Bridge
Skjeggestad Bridge
Skjervøy Bridge
Skjomen Bridge
Skodje Bridge
Smaalenene Bridge
Smines Bridge
Sneppen Bridge
Sommarøy Bridge
Sortland Bridge
Sotra Bridge
Spissøy Bridge
Stavanger City Bridge
Stokkøy Bridge
Stolma Bridge
Stord Bridge
Store Lauvøysund Bridge
Storseisundet Bridge
Straumsund Bridge
Strømmen Bridge
Støvset Bridge
Sundklakkstraumen Bridge
Sundøy Bridge
Svinesund Bridge
Svinøy Bridge
Sykkylven Bridge
Sørstraumen Bridge
Sørstraumen Bridge
Sørsund Bridge, Kristiansund

T
Tana Bridge
Tiendeholmen Bridge
Tjeldsund Bridge
Tjønnøy Bridge
Trengsel Bridge
Tromsø Bridge
Tromøy Bridge
Turøy Bridge

U
Ullasund Bridge
Ulnes Bridge

V
Valsøy Bridge
Varodd Bridge
Vassås Bridge
Vevangstraumen Bridge
Vrengen Bridge

W
West Bridge

Å
Åkviksundet Bridge
Åselistraumen Bridge

Notes and references 
 

 

 

 Others references

See also 

 List of bridges in Norway by length
 Transport in Norway
 Rail transport in Norway
 Geography of Norway
 National Protection Plan for Roads, Bridges, and Road-Related Cultural Heritage
 National Tourist Routes in Norway

External links

Further reading 
 

Norway
 
Bridges
Bridges